The Jets' flagship radio station is WEPN, 1050 ESPN, with "The Voice of the Jets," Bob Wischusen as the play-by-play announcer and former Jet Marty Lyons as the color analyst. Wischusen, who joined WABC in 1997, took over the play-by-play role in 2002 after Howard David left the organization earlier in the year. Lyons would join Wischusen the same year after the team began a re-evaluation of the broadcasting booth that would result in the surprising firing of Dave Jennings, "a smart and credible analyst," after fourteen years in the booth. 

WABC, which served three separate stints as the Jets' radio flagship, simulcasted WEPN's coverage over its airwaves from 2002 until 2008. Jets radio broadcasts have also been carried over WCBS, which also served two stints as the Jets' flagship and last carried games over the air in 1992, and WFAN, which aired games from 1993 through 1999.

Any preseason games not nationally televised are shown on WCBS-TV. Ian Eagle, who was previously the radio voice of the Jets, calls the action on those telecasts. SportsNet New York, which serves as the home of the Jets, airs over 250 hours of "exclusive, in depth" material on the team in high definition.

Notable past play-by-play announcers for the Titans/Jets include the legends Howard Cosell, Bob Murphy, Merle Harmon, Marty Glickman and Howard David, who has called the Super Bowl and the NBA Finals for Westwood One and ESPN Radio.

Broadcasters by year

 Spanish language stations

 WADO (2000-2011)
 WEPN (2012-2018)
 WADO / WQBU (2019)

 Spanish language announcers

 Clemson Smith Muñiz (2000-present; play-by-play)
 Oscar Benítez (2000-2019; color analyst)
 Roberto Abramowitz (2020; color analyst)

Radio affiliates

New York

New Jersey

California

References

 
American Football League announcers
Lists of National Football League announcers by team
Broadcasters